7 Lá (Seacht Lá, meaning "seven days") is an Irish-language weekly current affairs show. All topics are discussed but particular focus is given to regional and Gaeltacht affairs.

External links
 

Irish-language television shows
RTÉ News and Current Affairs
TG4 original programming